Alexandre Licata (born 2 January 1984) is a French former professional footballer who played as a striker.

Career
Licata was born in Grenoble. He started his career at Lille OSC. Licata joined CS Louhans-Cuiseaux in 2004 when they were in the Championnat National, scoring 20 goals in his first two seasons. On 9 May 2009, the 25-year-old striker from AS Monaco signed a new four-year contract with AJ Auxerre, who offered him a much higher salary.

He was drafted in to help score goals, as fellow striker Daniel Niculae failed to score a single goal in the 2008–09 season. However, he has missed all of the season up until April 2010 because of a serious ankle injury. After never fully recover from the injury he decided to retire in 2012.

Career statistics

References

External links

Living people
1984 births
Sportspeople from Grenoble
French footballers
Footballers from Auvergne-Rhône-Alpes
Association football forwards
Ligue 1 players
Ligue 2 players
Lille OSC players
Louhans-Cuiseaux FC players
AS Monaco FC players
FC Gueugnon players
SC Bastia players
AJ Auxerre players